thumb|right|200px 
The Cathedral of Vila Real, also known as the Church of St. Dominic is a Roman Catholic cathedral in Vila Real, Portugal. It is the seat of the Diocese of Vila Real.

Dominican friars from Guimaraes built it as a convent in 1424; it is an example of Gothic architecture. Since 19 February 1926, it has been classified as a National Monument.

References
 

Vila Real
National monuments in Vila Real District
Gothic architecture in Portugal
1424 establishments in Europe
Buildings and structures in Vila Real District
Buildings and structures in Vila Real
15th-century establishments in Portugal